Grasshopper is a visual programming language and environment that runs within the Rhinoceros 3D computer-aided design (CAD) application. The program was created by David Rutten at Robert McNeel & Associates. Programs are created by dragging components onto a canvas.  The outputs to these components are then connected to the inputs of subsequent components.

Overview

Grasshopper is primarily used to build generative algorithms, such as for generative art. Many of Grasshopper's components create 3D geometry. Programs may also contain other types of algorithms including numeric, textual, audio-visual and haptic applications.

Advanced uses of Grasshopper include parametric modelling for structural engineering, parametric modelling for architecture and fabrication, lighting performance analysis for eco-friendly architecture and building energy consumption.

The first version of Grasshopper, then called Explicit History, was released in September 2007. Grasshopper has become part of the standard Rhino toolset in Rhino 6.0 and later.

AEC Magazine stated that Grasshopper is "Popular among students and professionals, McNeel Associate’s Rhino modelling tool is endemic in the architectural design world. The new Grasshopper environment provides an intuitive way to explore designs without having to learn to script." Research supporting this claim has come from product design and architecture.

See also
 Architectural engineering
 Comparison of CAD software
 Design computing
 Parametric design
 Generative design
 Responsive computer-aided design
 Visual programming language

References

Further reading
 K Lagios, J Niemasz and C F Reinhart, "Animated Building Performance Simulation (ABPS) - Linking Rhinoceros/Grasshopper with Radiance/Daysim", Accepted for Publication in the Proceedings of SimBuild 2010, New York City, August 2010 (full article).
 J Niemasz, J Sargent, C F Reinhart, "Solar Zoning and Energy in Detached Residential Dwellings", Proceedings of SimAUD 2011, Boston, April 2011
 Arturo Tedeschi, Architettura Parametrica - Introduzione a Grasshopper, II edizione, Le Penseur, Brienza 2010,  
 Arturo Tedeschi, Parametric Architecture with Grasshopper, Le Penseur, Brienza 2011, 
 Arturo Tedeschi, AAD Algorithms-Aided Design, Parametric Strategies using Grasshopper, Le Penseur, Brienza 2014, 
 Pedro Molina-Siles, Parametric Environment. The Handbook of grasshopper. Nodes & Exercises , Universitat Politècnica de València, 2016. 
Diego Cuevas, Advanced 3D Printing with Grasshopper: Clay and FDM (2020).

External links
 

Computer-aided design
Building engineering software
Computer-aided design software